Q Television Network was the first American cable television channel which aired programming targeted to the lesbian, gay, and bisexual  audiences. Founded by Frank Olson, and eventually owned by Triangle Multimedia Inc. The cable channel aired a mix of film, documentary and music programming, along with a number of original live talk information and news programs.

History
Personalities associated with QTN programming included Jack E. Jett, Jackie Enx, Rob Williams, Elizabeth Melendez, Nick Oram, Steve Kmetko, Honey Labrador, Joe Bechely, Reichen Lehmkuhl,  and Chrisanne Eastwood.

In 2005, Q became available in Australia via SelecTV.

QTN ceased regular operations as of February 2006 amid allegations of corporate thievery and management incompetence. Q employees were ultimately locked out with thousands of dollars in back pay owed to them. The stock price of the company, traded under the acronym QBID was reverse merged into Circa Pictures and currently valued at under .0001.  QTN's former CEO, Frank Olsen, was pulled into California Labor's Court and lost, and was found responsible for over $2 million in unpaid wages and fines.  Olsen, now insolvent, died in Palm Springs, CA some months after the decision and his body remained unclaimed in the Riverside County morgue for weeks.

Some of the production staff and crew reunited under the direction of Queer Edge associate producer Sean Carnage on March 6, 2006 to produce the critically acclaimed music documentary 40 Bands 80 Minutes!.

See also 
 Shortbus, a 2006 American erotic comedy-drama film, produced in association with Q Television Network.

References

Defunct television networks in the United States
LGBT-related television channels
LGBT-related mass media in the United States
Television channels and stations disestablished in 2006